Travis Dodson (born October 14, 1985, in Silver City, New Mexico) is a retired Marine and Paralympian from Deming, New Mexico. Dodson served in the United States Marine Corps and was wounded in action by a hand grenade in the Iraq War in 2007.

Career
He competed for the United States at the 2014 Winter Paralympics in cross-country skiing (Men's 1 km Sprint Classic and Men's 10 km) and biathlon (Men's 7.5 km and Men's 15 km). At the 2018 Winter Paralympics he had switched to para ice hockey. He was on the gold medal-winning team.

References

External links

1985 births
Living people
American amputees
American sledge hockey players
Paralympic sledge hockey players of the United States
Paralympic gold medalists for the United States
Biathletes at the 2014 Winter Paralympics
Cross-country skiers at the 2014 Winter Paralympics
Para ice hockey players at the 2018 Winter Paralympics
Para ice hockey players at the 2022 Winter Paralympics
Medalists at the 2018 Winter Paralympics
Medalists at the 2022 Winter Paralympics
Ice hockey people from New Mexico
People from Deming, New Mexico
People from Silver City, New Mexico
Paralympic medalists in sledge hockey
United States Marine Corps personnel of the Iraq War
United States Marines